Dannes Arcenio Coronel Campoverde (May 24, 1973 – July 7, 2020) was an Ecuadorian football defender.

Club career
He played for several clubs in his native country, including giants Emelec, El Nacional 
and Barcelona.

International career
Coronel made 27 appearances for the Ecuador national team between 1992 and 2000.

Death
Coronel suffered a heart attack on July 7, 2020 and died on the same day, at the age of 47 in the Naranjal Canton, Guayas.

Honors

Club
 Emelec
 Serie A de Ecuador: 1993, 1994

Nation
 Ecuador
 Canada Cup: 1999

References

External links

1973 births
2020 deaths
People from Naranjal, Ecuador
Association football defenders
Ecuadorian footballers
Ecuador international footballers
1993 Copa América players
1995 Copa América players
1999 Copa América players
C.S. Emelec footballers
C.D. El Nacional footballers
C.D. Cuenca footballers
Barcelona S.C. footballers
C.S.D. Macará footballers